Die Schweizer Familie (The Swiss Family) is an opera by the Austrian composer Joseph Weigl. It takes the form of a Singspiel in three acts. The libretto, by Ignaz Franz Castelli, is based on the vaudeville Pauvre Jacques (1807) by Charles-Augustin de Basson-Pierre, known as Sewrin, and René de Chazet. The opera was first performed at the Theater am Kärntnertor, conducted by the composer, in Vienna on 14 March 1809 and was a great success in German-speaking countries in the early 19th century.

Roles

Synopsis 
The Bolls, the Swiss family of the title, have been banished to an unspecified region in the Alps. Their daughter, Emmeline, pines for the love of Jakob, to whom she is secretly engaged. The local count, whose life was saved by Richard Boll, also shows concern for Emmeline's sufferings and with his help Emmeline and Jakob are reunited.

Recording 
Die Schweizer Familie Soloists, Chorus and Orchestra Dreieck, conducted by Uri Rom (Guild, 2006)

Legacy 
Ignaz Moscheles wrote a set of 12 variations for piano (Op. 5) on the air "Wer hörte wohl jemals mich klagen".

References

Further reading 
 Axel Beer: "Die Oper daheim. Variationen als Rezeptionsform; Verzeichnis der Variationswerke über Themen aus Weigls Schweizer Familie". In Hans-Joachim Hinrichsen, Klaus Pietschmann (editor): Jenseits der Bühne. Bearbeitungs- und Rezeptionsformen der Oper im 19. und 20. Jahrhundert (Schweizer Beiträge zur Musikforschung; vol. 15). Bärenreiter-Verlag, Kassel 2011, .
 Werner Bollert: "Joseph Weigl und das deutsche Singspiel". In: Aufsätze zur Musikgeschichte. Postberg-Verlag, Bottrop 1938, .
 Hermann Dechant (ed.): Die Schweizer Familie. Score edition (Denkmäler der Tonkunst in Österreich). Akademische Verlagsanstalt, Vienna (in preparation).
 Klaus Döge: "'welche nicht nur dem Publikum, sondern auch mir selbst wirklich gefiel'. Richard Wagners Einlegearie zu Joseph Weigls Die Schweizerfamilie". In: Wolfgang Hirschmann (ed.): Aria. Eine Festschrift für Wolfgang Ruf. Olms, Hildesheim 2011, .
 Sabine Henze-Döhring: "Gattungskonvergenzen – Gattungsumbrüche. Zur Situation der deutschsprachigen Oper um 1800". In: Marcus Chr. Lippe [editor), Oper im Aufbruch. Gattungskonzepte des deutschsprachigen Musiktheaters um 1800. published by Marcus Chr. Lippe, Kassel: Bosse 2007 (Kölner Beiträge zur Musikwissenschaft, vol. 9), .
 August Glück: "Der Kühreihen in J. Weigl's Schweizerfamilie. Eine Studie", in: Vierteljahrsschrift für Musikwissenschaft 8 (1892), Leipzig 1892, p. 77–90.
 Annette Landau: "Die Schweizerfamilie von Joseph Weigl und Ignaz Franz Castelli". In: Anselm Gerhard (editor): Schweizer Töne. Die Schweiz im Spiegel der Musik. Chronos-Verlag, Zürich 2000, .
 Klaus Pietschmann: "Gattungs- und Stilvielfalt im musikdramatischen Schaffen Joseph Weigls". In: Oper im Aufbruch. Gattungskonzepte des deutschsprachigen Musiktheaters um 1800, Kassel 2007.
 Till Gerrit Waidelich: "Zur Rezeptionsgeschichte von Joseph Weigls Schweizer Familie in Biedermeier und Vormärz". In: Schubert. Perspektiven, vol. 2 (2002), .
 Till Gerrit Waidelich: "Das Bild der Schweiz in der österreichischen Musik des 19. Jahrhunderts". 190. Neujahrsblatt der AMG Zürich (2006), Winterthur 2005.

External links 

Operas by Joseph Weigl
Operas set in Switzerland
1809 operas
Singspiele
German-language operas
Operas
Operas based on plays